Ivan "Vančo" Trajčev (born 5 July 1975) is a retired footballer from the Republic of Macedonia which was lastly played for FK Bregalnica Stip.

International career
He made his senior debut for Macedonia in a September 1998 friendly match against Egypt and has earned a total of 7 caps, scoring no goals. His final international was a November 2005 friendly against Paraguay.

References

External sources
 
 Transfer to FK Bregalnica Stip www.vest.com.mk

1975 births
Living people
People from Probištip
Association football midfielders
Macedonian footballers
North Macedonia international footballers
FK Vardar players
Ethnikos Achna FC players
AEK Larnaca FC players
FK Sileks players
FK Rabotnički players
FK Renova players
FK Bregalnica Štip players
Macedonian First Football League players
Cypriot First Division players
Macedonian expatriate footballers
Expatriate footballers in Cyprus
Macedonian expatriate sportspeople in Cyprus